The 2014 Dublin Senior Hurling Championship was the 125th staging of the Dublin Senior Hurling Championship since its establishment by the Dublin County Board in 1887. The knock-out championship began on 26 September 2014 and ended on 26 October 2014.

Ballyboden St. Enda's were the defending champions, however, they were defeated in the semi-final stage. Kilmacud Crokes won the title following a 2-16 to 1-15 defeat of St. Jude's in the final.

Fixtures and results

Group 1
Source.

Group 2
Source.

Group 3
Source.

Group 4
Source.

Relegation play-offs

Quarter-finals

Semi-finals

Final

External links
 Dublin GAA website

References

Dublin Senior Hurling Championship
Dublin Senior Hurling Championship